The 1958 South Dakota Coyotes football team was an American football team that represented the University of South Dakota as a member of the North Central Conference (NCC) during the 1958 NCAA College Division football season. In their third season under head coach Ralph Stewart, the Coyotes compiled a 5–4 record (4–2 against NCC opponents), finished in fourth place out of seven teams in the NCC, scored 137 points, and gave up 137 points. They played their home games at Inman Field in Vermillion, South Dakota.

Schedule

References

South Dakota
South Dakota Coyotes football seasons
South Dakota Coyotes football